The Judgment House is a 1917 American silent drama film directed by J. Stuart Blackton and written by J. Stuart Blackton based upon the novel by Gilbert Parker. The film stars Violet Heming, Wilfred Lucas, Conway Tearle, Paul Doucet, Florence Deshon, and Lucille Hammill. The film was released on November 19, 1917, by Paramount Pictures.

Plot
As described in a film magazine, Jasmine Grenfel (Heming) forsakes her suitor Ian Stafford (Tearle) and marries Rudyard Byng (Lucas), who has worked his way up to the top rungs of success in the African diamond mines of the Transvaal. Stafford, saddened, goes to Africa. During the three years that follow Byng becomes dissipated. Adrian Fellowes (Doucet), his secretary, has intrigues with several women including the dancer Al'Mah (Deshon). He has also paid some attention to Jasmine, which has aroused the dancer's jealousy. Fellowes is found murdered and the husband and wife both suspect each other of the crime. At the outbreak of the Boer War Byng joins the army and Jasmine and Al'Mah join the Red Cross. The battles that ensue bring out the manhood of Byng. Al'Mah is struck by a fragment of a shell and in a dying confession admits the murder of Fellow. Jasmine and Byng are later happily reunited.

Cast 
Violet Heming as Jasmine Grenfel
Wilfred Lucas as Rudyard Byng
Conway Tearle as Ian Stafford
Paul Doucet as Adrian Fellowes
Florence Deshon as Al'Mah
Lucille Hammill as Lou
Crazy Thunder as Krool

Reception
Like many American films of the time, The Judgment House was subject to cuts by city and state film censorship boards. For example, the Chicago Board of Censors cut the intertitle "Did Fellowes lead you to believe that I am bad?"

References

External links

 
 Parker, Gilbert (1913), The Judgment House; a Novel, Toronto: The Copp, Clark Co., on the Internet Archive

1917 films
1910s English-language films
Silent American drama films
1917 drama films
Paramount Pictures films
Films based on works by Gilbert Parker
Films directed by J. Stuart Blackton
American black-and-white films
American silent feature films
Films based on Canadian novels
1910s American films